Apple chips are chips or crisps that are prepared using apple. When stale, apple chips become drier and crispier. Contrary to modern belief, apple chips do not become chewier when stale, only harder. Apple chips may be fried, deep fried, vacuum fried, dehydrated or baked. Apple chips may have a dense and crispy texture, or may be puffed, yet still crispy. Microwave vacuum-drying may be used to prepare apple chips with a puffy and crispy texture. They may be seasoned with cinnamon and sweetened with confectioners sugar. Apple chips may be consumed as a snack food, and may be accompanied with various dips and other foods. Apple chips are mass-produced in the United States.

Use in dishes
Apple chips may be used in sandwiches and as an ingredient in desserts and sweets, such as cookies. They may also be used as a garnish on dishes.

Manufacturers
Apple chips are mass-produced by some food manufacturers. Companies that produce them include Seneca Foods, Bare Fruit, Buddy Fruits and Tyrrell's Bare Fruit and Buddy Fruits apple chips are prepared using only apples as their sole ingredient.

See also

 Banana chip
 List of apple dishes
 List of deep fried foods
 List of dried foods

References

Further reading
 

Chip
Deep fried foods
Dried fruit
Snack foods
Baked goods